Chandidas Mahavidyalaya, established in 1972, is a government affiliated college located at Khujutipara  in the Birbhum district of West Bengal. It is affiliated to University of Burdwan and teaches arts, science and commerce.

Departments

Science

Chemistry
Physics
Mathematics
Zoology
Botany

Arts and Commerce
Bengali
English
History
Geography
Sanskrit
Economics
Philosophy
Political Science
Accountancy

Accreditation
The college is recognized by the University Grants Commission (UGC).

See also

References

External links
Chandidas Mahavidyalaya

Universities and colleges in Birbhum district
Colleges affiliated to University of Burdwan
Educational institutions established in 1972
1972 establishments in West Bengal